Beaumont is a locality in the City of Shoalhaven in New South Wales, Australia. It lies on Cambewarra Range about 18 km north of Nowra on both sides of the Kangaroo Valley–Nowra road. It includes the Cambewarra Mountain lookout, which gives a good view of the lower Shoalhaven valley.

References

City of Shoalhaven
Localities in New South Wales